Barry Bonds hit numerous milestone home runs during his 22 seasons in Major League Baseball with the Pittsburgh Pirates and San Francisco Giants. Bonds ranks among the greatest baseball players of all time and was for much of his career considered a five-tool player. Bonds' ascension towards the top of  experts' lists of greatest players was propelled by highly productive years in which he set many records. By 1998, he was considered among the 50 greatest players of all time by The Sporting News, and after winning the National League's Most Valuable Player Award four consecutive times from 2001–2004, he jumped into the top 10 in the 2005 list. He now holds numerous Major League Baseball records for home runs, bases on balls, intentional bases on balls, slugging percentage and on-base percentage, as well as a record seven MVP awards.

In baseball, the home run is one of the most popular aspects of the game. Thus, the career record for home runs is among the most important and respected records in baseball. The road to this record has been closely followed and each additional home run Bonds hits extends the current record further. On August 7, 2007, Barry Bonds became the major leagues' career home run champion by hitting his 756th career home run, which surpassed Hank Aaron's total.
  
Quite often milestone home runs such as round hundred and career records are considered breaking news, and sports news services give coverage to countdowns on impending milestone home runs. Several of Bonds' milestone home runs were given dedicated coverage on ESPN BottomLine, with Chasing Ruth and Chasing Aaron coverage being quite extensive for the few seasons preceding the breaking of the record. Sports collectible dealers and buyers pay exorbitant sums for paraphernalia associated with such milestones. The Baseball Hall of Fame covets such paraphernalia for display. In fact, players are even sensitive to the way in which their paraphernalia is displayed. A baseball that was hit for a milestone causes such a mêlée and such hysteria that special balls have to be used to stop counterfeiting, and police escorts are necessary for those who catch such balls.

Because of Bonds' versatility even some of his early milestones were quite significant.  Barry Bonds' milestone home runs have received extensive coverage since his 300th made him the fourth member of the 300–300 club which also included his godfather Willie Mays and father Bobby Bonds.  His 400th home run also received national coverage, and his 400–400 feat was a motivating goal and is widely cited as a testament to his greatness. His 500th home run was part of a memorable 2001 Major League Baseball season of milestones in which he hit a record 73 home runs in a single season and surpassed many baseball legends. His 554th home run and 60th of the season sold for US$5000. His 567th and 73rd of the season sold for $500,000, which was far less than the $3 million for which Mark McGwire's 70th had been sold three years earlier. Bonds' 660th home run was more celebrated than his 661st because it put him in the same company as his own godfather on the all-time list. Bonds' 600th and 700th home runs both were widely followed and reported in the media because they placed him such elite company. Bonds' 756th home run sold for $752,467 (including a 20% commission). Below is a list of Barry Bonds' milestone home runs.

Milestone home runs

Career home run leaders

Through the 2021 Major League Baseball season the following are the career home run leaders:

See also

 Progression of the single-season MLB home run record

Notes

Barry Bonds
Bonds
Major League Baseball statistics
Bonds